The manga Hokuto no Ken (known as Fist of the North Star in its English editions) by Buronson and Tetsuo Hara was originally published by Shueisha in the magazine Weekly Shōnen Jump from 1983 to 1988, and the series was subsequently reprinted in 27 collected editions (tankōbon) under the Jump Comics imprint. During the 1990s, Shueisha reprinted Hokuto no Ken in 15 hardcover aizōban editions, as well as 15 corresponding economy-sized bunko editions.

After Tetsuo Hara left Shueisha, other companies started reprinting the manga under license from Hara's new employer Coamix. A 31-volume tankōbon was published by Shinchosha under the Bunch World imprint from 2001 to 2002, followed by a 12-volume conbini comic edition published by Tokuma Shoten under the Tokuma Favorite Comics imprint in 2004. A 14-volume Kanzenban edition was published by Shogakukan in 2006 under the Big Comics Selection imprint, featuring the original water-colored artwork and opening pages from the Weekly Shōnen Jump serialization. It has also been released in 27-volume e-book edition.

In 2013, the kyūkyokuban or "Extreme Edition" began publication by Tokuma Shoten under the "Zenon Comics DX" imprint. This 18-volume edition, in addition to featuring all the pages from both, the tankōbon and kanzenban edition, has new cover artwork by Tetsuo Hara himself for each volume, as well as a new 30th anniversary-themed chapter titled Hokuto no Ken: Last Piece, which is included in Volume 11.

Viz Communications published the first sixteen chapters of Fist of the North Star in English as an eight-issue monthly comic in 1989, which were later reprinted in a single graphic novel collection in 1995. During that same year, Viz resumed publication of the series as a monthly comic until 1997, lasting eighteen issues (spanning chapters 17-44), which were subsequently reprinted in three additional graphic novels. The license was later acquired by Gutsoon! Entertainment, which published a new translation of the series in the form of a "Master Edition" featuring newly colorized artwork and retained the original right-to-left orientation of the art, as well as new cover artwork by Tetsuo Hara from the fourth volume and onward. Fist of the North Star: Master Edition was published from 2002 to 2003, lasting only nine volumes, due to Gutsoon!'s withdrawal from the North American market. In 2020, Viz Media announced that they reacquired Fist of the North Star license and would republish the title under the Viz Signature Edition line, with the first volume June 15, 2021. Currently seven volumes have been published.

Japanese volumes

Tankōbon edition (Jump Comics)

Aizōban edition

Bunkoban edition (Shueisha Bunko)

Kanzenban edition (Big Comics Special)

Kyūkyokuban edition (Zenon Comics DX)

English volumes

Viz Graphic Novels edition

Raijin Comics edition

Viz Signature Edition

References

External links

Chapters
Fist of the North Star